Endotricha rufofimbrialis is a species of snout moth in the genus Endotricha. It was described by William Warren in 1891, and is known from Borneo and northern India.

References

Moths described in 1891
Endotrichini